Adriano Fiori (17 December 1865, Casinalbo – 5 November 1950, Casinalbo) was an Italian botanist.

He studied medicine and natural sciences at the University of Modena, then spent several years working as an assistant at the botanical institute in Padua (1892–1900). From 1900 to 1913 he was a professor of natural sciences at the Forestry Institute of Vallombrosa, and from 1913 to 1936, he served as a professor in Florence.

During his career, he travelled extensively throughout Italy, during which, he studied and collected many plant specimens. He also spent considerable time botanizing in the Italian colony of Eritrea. He donated tens of thousands of specimens to the herbarium in Florence that included 1300 items from Eritrea.

Principal published works 
 Flora analitica d'Italia, (with Giulio Paoletti), 1896–1904.
 Piante raccolte nella colonia eritrea nel 1909 (Plants collected in the colony of Eritrea in 1909), 1913.
 Nuova flora analitica d'Italia, 1923–1929.
 Iconographia florae italicae (with Giulio Paoletti), 1933.

References 

1865 births
1950 deaths
People from the Province of Modena
19th-century Italian botanists
20th-century Italian botanists